Ivan Korzhev (born 24 November 1973) is a Russian artist specialising in sculpture and modern architecture. He was an author of numerous monumental, indoor, memorial, park sculpture artworks. He was also known for his architectural creations and was awarded in 2008 the title of Merited Artist of the Russian Federation.

References

1973 births
Living people
Russian artists
Honored Artists of the Russian Federation